Whall is a surname. Notable people with the surname include:

 Christopher Whall (1849–1924), British artist
 Veronica Whall (1887–1967), British artist
 W. B. Whall (1847–1917), Master mariner

See also
 Wall (surname)